Zhang Bowen is a Chinese sport shooter. He represented China at the 2020 Summer Olympics in Tokyo, competing in the Men's 10 metre air rifle.

References

1996 births
Living people
Shooters at the 2020 Summer Olympics
Olympic shooters of China
People from Binzhou
Chinese male sport shooters